is Ali Project's 25th single. This single was released on August 19, 2009 under Glory Heaven, a sublabel of Lantis, an anime music company.

The single title will be used as the second opening theme for the anime series Phantom ~Requiem for the Phantom~.

This single will only come in a regular CD only edition. The single's catalog number is LASM-4020.

Track listing

Charts and sales

2009 singles
2009 songs
Ali Project songs
Anime songs